The Group 6A South Region is a division of the Virginia High School League. Along with the 6A North Region, it consists of the largest high schools in Virginia. The region was formed in 2013 when the VHSL adopted a six classification format and eliminated the previous three classification system. For the purpose of regular season competition, schools compete within districts that existed prior to 2013, while post-season competition will be organized within four conferences that make up each region.

Conferences for 2013–14 and 2014–15

Coastal Conference 1
Bayside High School of Virginia Beach
First Colonial High School of Virginia Beach
Frank W. Cox High School of Virginia Beach
Landstown High School of Virginia Beach
Ocean Lakes High School of Virginia Beach
Tallwood High School of Virginia Beach
Granby High School of Norfolk

Monitor Merrimac Conference 2
Bethel High School of Hampton
Kecoughtan High School of Hampton
Woodside High School of Newport News
Grassfield High School of Chesapeake
Oscar Smith High School of Chesapeake
Western Branch High School of Chesapeake

Conference 3
Varina High School of Richmond
Thomas Dale High School of Chester
Cosby High School of Midlothian
James River High School of Midlothian
Franklin County High School of Rocky Mount
Patrick Henry High School of Roanoke

Conference 4
Gar-Field High School of Woodbridge
C. D. Hylton High School of Woodbridge
Colonial Forge High School of Stafford
Riverbend High School of Spotsylvania
Freedom High School of Woodbridge
Forest Park Senior High School of Woodbridge
Woodbridge High School of Woodbridge

External links
 VHSL-Reference 
 Virginia High School League

Virginia High School League
High school sports in Virginia